Ruby Karp (born August 30, 2000) is an American writer and comedian.

Writing
Karp began writing professionally in 2011 at the age of 10 when Molly McAleer, co-founder of Hello Giggles, asked her to contribute to the website by writing "Ruby's Corner", a weekly column that covered a variety of topics involving her observations and life experiences. She has also written articles for Mashable titled "I'm 13 and None of My Friends Use Facebook", which went viral, and "How 13-Year-Olds Really Use Snapchat". In 2017, she published her first book, Earth Hates Me, an inside look at being a teenager. She has also written for Refinery29 as well as the "Sparklife" section of the education-oriented blog SparkNotes.

Comedy
On her third birthday, Karp found herself onstage at UCB as a guest on Talk Show with Paul Scheer and Jake Fogelnest. Since then, she's performed monologues at ASSSSCAT, a monoscene with Chris Gethard, and appeared in an alien costume in a performance of the Broad City Live show in 2012.  In 2004, she appeared on the first episode of Shutterbugs with Aziz Ansari and Rob Huebel on the MTV sketch comedy television show Human Giant. In 2008, Karp spoke about being a feminist with Amy Poehler on her web series Smart Girls at the Party when she was 7 years old. She performed in a variety of shows at UCB and, in February 2011, started hosting the story-telling show, Hello Giggles Presents Very Important Things. This show has since become the current, monthly stand-up show, We Hope You have Fun. She has performed stand up at other UCB shows including Fresh Out, Adulting, and Andy Blitz and Andy Blitz's Friends.

Speaking
Karp won a MOTH Story Slam when she was 12 years old at Housing Works. She spoke about being a feminist at TEDxRedmond in September 2013.  She was an ambassador for Dove on positive body image and spoke at the UN on this topic on September 25, 2014. She hosted the second annual Student Voice Live on September 20, 2014. In September 2017, she moderated the B-Fest panel at Barnes and Noble.

Personal life
Ruby Karp attended Emerson College. Her mother, Marcelle Karp, is a TV producer and a co-founder of the women's lifestyle magazine Bust.

References

External links
 Official Website
 Feminism Activism: Ruby Karp at TEDxRedmond (2013)
 The Feminist: Smart Girls at the Party with Amy Poehler feat. Ruby Karp (2008)

2000 births
21st-century American women writers
American feminists
American sketch comedians
American women comedians
Upright Citizens Brigade Theater performers
Living people
21st-century American comedians